Rouge Cloître (French) or Rood-Klooster (Dutch) is a former Augustinian Priory, founded in 1367. It is located in the Sonian Forest, in south-eastern Brussels, Belgium. It was abolished in 1796. Today, it is administered from Auderghem, which is a commune of Brussels.

This area on the edge of the forest, surrounded by lakes through which the Roodkloosterbeek (Rouge-Cloître stream) passes, has been called the  Rouge-Cloître estate from the 16th century until the present day. It was used for hunting in the 16th and 17th centuries and today is popular with nature-lovers and ramblers.

Etymology
The name Roodklooster, Rooklooster, or Rouge-Cloître comes from Roode Cluse (or kluizenarij) which according to some means the Red Hermitage. According to this theory, the walls of the original hermitage were coated in crushed tiles, which produced the characteristic red colour. It was then natural for the name to continue in use after the foundation became a priory (Rouge-Cloitre). Another (more scientific) explanation is the location in an open spot in the forest, a 'ro' or 'rode' (Compare Rolduc). Its official name in French is Saint-Paul en Soignes.

History

Foundation
A hermitage was built in 1366 by a priest called Gilles Olivier and a layman called Walter van der Molen. William Daniel, a priest of the parish of Boendael, also celebrated Mass there from time to time. The founding charter was witnessed by Joanna, Duchess of Brabant, on March 1, 1367. Shortly after, some time between 1367 and 1369 and following the example of the nearby Groenendael Priory, the community adopted the Rule of St. Augustine.

The foundation was confirmed in 1373 by Gérard de Dainville, Bishop of Cambrai and the following year was affiliated to the order of Chanoines réguliers de saint Augustin (Canons Regular of St. Augustine). The community grew quickly. In 1381, construction of the church was initiated, after receiving gifts of land and lakes from the Duchess of Brabant, as well as privileges and tax exemptions.

Development
In 1402, along with other Brabant priories, Rouge-Cloître formed a congregation (or General Chapter) which was led by Groenendael. In 1412, as part of the Groenendael congregation, the abbey joined the Windesheim congregation. These first centuries of the priory were ones of great devotion. It possessed a fine library and developed a notable illumination workshop.

The location of the monastery provided easy access to the sandstone necessary for construction and wood from the forest was used for furniture and heating. Springs are plentiful in the area, the ponds supplied fish, and a water mill on the stream was used to grind grain and press oil. Part of the forest was cleared to provide cattle pasture. In 1400, an enclosure was created which partly survives today.

The white sandstone church is decorated with paintings from Rubens' studio and in the 16th century, the monastery was one of the most prestigious in the Spanish Netherlands, in large part due to its proximity to Brussels. Charles V, the Holy Roman Emperor, Albert VII, Archduke of Austria and Isabella of Spain all stayed there, as well as many other notable personages.

At the end of the 16th century, during the Dutch Revolt, the priory was pillaged and the canons were forced to take refuge in Brussels until the uprising was over.

References

Robert Devleeshouwer, L'arrondissement du Brabant sous l'occupation française. 1794-1795, Bruxelles, 1964, p. 316; et Henri Pirenne, Histoire de Belgique, tome III, p. 207.

1367 establishments in Europe
Augustinian monasteries in Belgium
Christian monasteries in Brussels
Auderghem